{{Infobox character
| name = Darth Vader
| colour = 
| image = Darth Vader.png
| caption = Darth Vader, as he appeared throughout the Star Wars franchise
| series = Star Wars
| first = Star Wars (1977)
| creator = George Lucas
| portrayer = 
| voice = 

| full_name = Anakin Skywalker
| alias = The Chosen One
| occupation = {{Plainlist|
 Slave
 Padawan
 Jedi Knight
 Member of the Jedi High Council
 Jedi General in the Grand Army of the Republic
 Dark Lord of the Sith{{efn|Episodes III–VI, Rogue One, Rebels, Obi-Wan Kenobi}}
 Commander-in-Chief of the Imperial Military
}}
| lbl21 = Master
| data21 = 
| lbl22 = Apprentice
| data22 = 

| lbl23 = Homeworld
| data23 = Tatooine
| lbl24 = Born
| data24 = 41 
| lbl25 = Died
| data25 = 4 
| affiliation = 
| weapon = Lightsaber

| family = Shmi Skywalker (mother)
| spouse = Padmé Amidala (wife)
| children = Luke Skywalker (son)
Leia Organa Solo (daughter)
| relatives = Ben Solo (grandson)

| extra-hdr   = Extended Family
| lbl31       = Canon
| data31      =

| lbl32       = Legends
| data32      =

}}

Darth Vader is a fictional character in the Star Wars franchise. The character is the central antagonist of the original trilogy and, as Anakin Skywalker, is one of the main protagonists in the prequel trilogy. Star Wars creator George Lucas has collectively referred to the first six episodic films of the franchise as "the tragedy of Darth Vader". He has become one of the most iconic villains in popular culture, and has been listed among the greatest villains and fictional characters ever. His masked face is one of the most iconic character designs of all time.

Originally a slave on Tatooine, Anakin Skywalker is a Jedi prophesied to bring balance to the Force. He is lured to the dark side of the Force by Chancellor Palpatine (Darth Sidious) and becomes a Sith Lord, assuming the name of Darth Vader. After a lightsaber battle with his former mentor Obi-Wan Kenobi on Mustafar, in which he is severely injured, Vader is transformed into a cyborg. Now the Emperor's handpicked right-hand, he serves the Galactic Empire for over two decades as the Commander-in-Chief of its forces, purging the last Jedi and hunting the Rebels. Vader ultimately redeems himself by saving his son, Luke Skywalker, and killing Palpatine, sacrificing his own life in the process. He is also the secret husband of Padmé Amidala, the biological father of Princess Leia, and the grandfather of Kylo Ren (Ben Solo). In the non-canonical Star Wars Legends continuity, he is also the grandfather of Ben Skywalker, his eponym Anakin Solo, Jaina Solo and Darth Caedus (Jacen Solo), and the great-grandfather of Allana Solo.

The character has been portrayed by numerous actors: David Prowse physically portrayed Vader while James Earl Jones has voiced him in all of the films and some television shows, and Sebastian Shaw portrayed the unmasked Anakin in Return of the Jedi, as well as the character's spirit in the original release of that film. Jake Lloyd played Anakin Skywalker as a child in The Phantom Menace, the first film of the prequel trilogy, while Hayden Christensen played him as a young adult in the following two films, post-2004 releases of Return of the Jedi, and Obi-Wan Kenobi.

In addition to the first six Star Wars films, the character appears in the anthology film Rogue One. He also appears in television series (most substantially The Clone Wars) and numerous iterations of the Star Wars Expanded Universe, including video games, novels, and comic books. Due to Vader's popularity, various merchandise of the character, such as action figures and replicas of his lightsaber, has been produced.

 Creation and development 

 Name 

According to Star Wars creator George Lucas, he experimented with various combinations of names for the character built upon the phrase "Dark Water". Then he "added lots of last names, Vaders and Wilsons and Smiths, and ... just came up with the combination of Darth and Vader". Other words which may have inspired the name are "death" and "invader", as well as the name of a high-school upperclassman of Lucas's, Gary Vader.

As no other character with the title "Darth" was introduced until the release of The Phantom Menace (1999), some viewers interpreted it as the character's first name, in part because Obi-Wan Kenobi addresses him as "Darth" in the original film. The moniker is bestowed upon Anakin in Revenge of the Sith (2005) upon his turn to the dark side of the Force.

Director Ken Annakin's films Swiss Family Robinson and Battle of the Bulge influenced the original trilogy, leading some to believe that Anakin was named after him. Lucas' publicist denied this following Annakin's death in 2009. Anakin and Luke's original surname "Starkiller" remained in the script until a few months into filming Star Wars, when it was dropped due to what Lucas called "unpleasant connotations" with Charles Manson and replaced with "Skywalker".

 In other countries 
In France, the character's name was changed to "" starting with the original film. The names of other characters were changed too, but his is the only name that has been maintained even in the most recent films. The title "Dark" was used in place of "Darth" for the other Sith lords as well.

In the Italian-language editions, Darth Vader is named "". In 2005, before the release of Episode III, an online survey asked Italian fans whether they would rather maintain the Italian name or switch it to the original: the first option won. In 2015, when Episode VII had to be released, the Italian localisation decided to change the name to the English "Darth Vader".

In Iceland his name is "" (which means "blackhead").

 Concept and writing 
In the first draft of The Star Wars, tall, grim general "Darth Vader" was already close in line with his final depiction, and the protagonist Annikin Starkiller had a role similar to that of his son Luke's as the 16-year-old son of a respected warrior. Originally, Lucas conceived of the Sith as a group that served the Emperor in the same way that the SS served Adolf Hitler. In developing the backstory for The Empire Strikes Back, Lucas condensed this into one character in the form of Darth Vader.

After the success of the original Star Wars film, Lucas hired science-fiction author Leigh Brackett to write the sequel with him. They held story conferences and, by late November 1977, Lucas had produced a handwritten treatment. In the first draft that Brackett would write from this, Luke's father appears as a ghost to instruct Luke. Lucas was disappointed with the script, but Brackett died of cancer before he could discuss it with her. With no writer available, Lucas wrote the next draft himself. In this draft, dated April 1, 1978, he made use of a new plot twist: Vader claims to be Luke's father. According to Lucas, he found this draft enjoyable to write, as opposed to the year-long struggles writing the first film. Lucas has said that he knew Vader was Luke's father while writing the first film, though the relationship is not explicitly evidenced before said draft of The Empire Strikes Back.

The new plot element of Luke's parentage had drastic effects on the series. Author Michael Kaminski argues in The Secret History of Star Wars that it is unlikely that the plot point had ever seriously been considered or even conceived of before 1978, and that the first film was clearly operating under a storyline where Vader was a separate character from Luke's father. After writing the second and third drafts in which the plot point was introduced, Lucas reviewed the new backstory he had created: Anakin had been Obi-Wan Kenobi's brilliant student and had a child named Luke, but was swayed to the dark side by Palpatine. Anakin battled Obi-Wan on a volcano and was badly wounded, but was then reborn as Vader. Meanwhile, Obi-Wan hid Luke on Tatooine while the Galactic Republic became the tyrannical Galactic Empire and Vader systematically hunted down and killed the Jedi. An early draft of Return of the Jedi ended with Luke taking Vader's helmet and declaring, "Now I am Vader."

After deciding to create the prequel trilogy, Lucas indicated that the story arc would be a tragic one depicting Anakin's fall to the dark side. He also saw that the prequels could form the beginning of one long story that started with Anakin's childhood and ended with his death, in what he has termed "the tragedy of Darth Vader". This was the final step towards turning the film series into a "saga". For the first prequel, Episode I: The Phantom Menace (1999), Lucas made Anakin nine years old to make the character's separation from his mother more poignant. Movie trailers focused on Anakin and a one-sheet poster showing him casting Vader's shadow informed otherwise unknowing audiences of the character's eventual fate. The movie ultimately achieved a primary goal of introducing audiences to Anakin, as well as introducing the concept that he is the Chosen One of an ancient Jedi prophecy, destined to bring balance to the Force. Lucas states in an interview recorded around the time of the third prequel, Revenge of the Sith (2005), that "Anakin is the Chosen One. Even when Anakin turns into Darth Vader, he is still the Chosen One."
Hayden Christensen spoke about Darth Vader's role in the six-film saga: "He believes he's the Chosen One. He doesn't do bad things knowing that they have a negative impact. So now there's a naiveté in him that doesn't it was there before. And it makes it more human in a lot of ways."

Michael Kaminski offers evidence that issues in Anakin's fall to the dark side prompted Lucas to make fundamental story changes, first revising the opening sequence of Revenge of the Sith to have Palpatine kidnapped and his apprentice, Count Dooku, killed by Anakin in cold blood as the first act in the latter's turn towards the dark side. After principal photography was complete in 2003, Lucas re-wrote Anakin's turn to the dark side; Anakin's fall from grace would now be motivated by a desire to save his wife, Padmé Amidala, rather than the previous version in which that reason was one of several, including that he genuinely believed that the Jedi were plotting to take over the Republic. This fundamental re-write was accomplished both through editing the principal footage, and new and revised scenes filmed during pick-ups in 2004.

During production of the animated The Clone Wars television series, Ahsoka Tano was developed to illustrate how Anakin develops from the brash, undisciplined Padawan apprentice in Attack of the Clones (2002) to the more reserved Jedi Knight in Revenge of the Sith. Clone Wars supervising director and Star Wars Rebels co-creator Dave Filoni said that giving Anakin responsibility for a Padawan was meant to place the character in a role that forced him to become more cautious and responsible. It would also give him insight into his relationship with Obi-Wan and depict how their relationship matured. Ahsoka and Anakin's relationship was seen as an essential story arc spanning both the animated film and Clone Wars television series. Filoni began thinking about the final confrontation between Ahsoka and Vader ever since he created the former; different iterations had different endings, including one in which Vader kills Ahsoka just as she slashes open his helmet to reveal his scarred face. A similar scene is included in an episode of Rebels, in which Ahsoka slashes Vader's helmet open, and the Sith Lord recognizes her. According to Filoni, Ahsoka's presence in the series allows Vader to encounter the show's lead characters without the latter being "destroyed", as Ahsoka can "stand toe-to-toe" with her former master.

 Design 

The original design of Darth Vader's costume did not originally include a helmet. The idea that Vader should wear a breathing apparatus was first proposed by concept artist Ralph McQuarrie during preproduction discussions for Star Wars with George Lucas in 1975. McQuarrie stated that Lucas's artistic direction was to portray a malevolent figure in a cape with samurai armor. "For Darth Vader, George just said he would like to have a very tall, dark fluttering figure that had a spooky feeling like it came in on the wind." McQuarrie noted that the script indicated that Vader would travel between spaceships and needed to survive in the vacuum of space, and he proposed that Vader should wear some sort of space suit. Lucas agreed, and McQuarrie combined a full-face breathing mask with a samurai helmet, thus creating one of the most iconic designs of space fantasy cinema. McQuarrie's 1975 production painting of Darth Vader engaged in a lightsaber duel with Deak Starkiller (a character prototype for Luke Skywalker) depicts Vader wearing black armor, a flowing cape and an elongated, skull-like mask and helmet. Its similarity to the final design of Vader's costume demonstrates that McQuarrie's earliest conception of Vader was so successful that very little needed to be changed for production.

Working from McQuarrie's designs, the costume designer John Mollo devised a costume that could be worn by an actor on-screen using a combination of clerical robes, a motorcycle suit, a German military helmet and a military gas mask. The prop sculptor Brian Muir created the helmet and armor used in the film.

The sound of the respirator function of Vader's mask was created by Ben Burtt using modified recordings of scuba breathing apparatus used by divers. The sound effect is trademarked in the U.S. Patent and Trademark Office under Trademark #77419252 and is officially described in the documentation as "The sound of rhythmic mechanical human breathing created by breathing through a scuba tank regulator."

Commentators have often pointed to the influence of Akira Kurosawa's films such as The Hidden Fortress (1958) on George Lucas, and Vader's samurai-inspired costume design is held up as a significant example of the Japanese influences on Star Wars.

It has long been rumored that the warrior on the front cover of Wishbone Ash's 1972 album Argus was the main inspiration behind Darth Vader. Vocalist and guitarist Andy Powell acknowledged this rumor although he himself cannot confirm if it is true as he had nothing to do with the conception of the cover art.

 Portrayals 
As Vader

Darth Vader was portrayed by bodybuilder David Prowse in the original film trilogy, with fencer Bob Anderson performing the character's lightsaber fight scenes.

Lucas chose to have a different actor be the voice of Vader, since Prowse had a strong West Country English accent that led the rest of the cast to nickname him "Darth Farmer". Lucas originally intended for Orson Welles to voice Vader, but after deciding that Welles's voice would be too recognizable, he cast the lesser-known James Earl Jones instead. Jones initially felt his contributions to the films were too small to warrant recognition and his role was uncredited at his request until the release of Return of the Jedi (1983). When Jones was specifically asked if he had supplied Vader's voice for Revenge of the Sith—either newly or from a previous recording—Jones answered, "You'd have to ask Lucas about that. I don't know." Hayden Christensen and Gene Bryant alternately portray Vader in Revenge of the Sith. During the production of Revenge of the Sith, Christensen asked Lucas if a special Vader suit could be constructed to fit his own body, rather than have a different actor don one of the original sets of Vader armor worn by Prowse. Brock Peters provided the voice of Darth Vader in the NPR/USC radio series. Both Spencer Wilding and Daniel Naprous portrayed Vader in Rogue One (2016), with Jones reprising his role as the character's voice.

Vader's character has also been portrayed in several video games; in games such as Rebel Assault II: The Hidden Empire and Dark Forces, visual effects artist C. Andrew Nelson appears in short sequences in the Vader costume, voiced by Scott Lawrence. Matt Sloan, who appeared in the YouTube parody Chad Vader, provided the voice of Darth Vader in The Force Unleashed. As a result of his video game appearances, Nelson was cast to appear as Vader in brief sequences inserted into the Special Edition of The Empire Strikes Back, in which Vader is seen boarding his shuttle.

In September 2022, it was confirmed that Jones would retire from voicing the character. His voice was digitally recreated by the company Respeecher for use in Obi-Wan Kenobi using artificial intelligence, and Jones later signed over the rights to his performance for future Star Wars productions.

As Anakin

During production of Return of the Jedi, the casting crew sought an experienced actor for the role of Anakin Skywalker since his death was unquestionably the emotional climax of the film, and Sebastian Shaw was selected for the role. When Shaw arrived at the set for filming, he ran into his friend Ian McDiarmid, the actor playing the Emperor. When McDiarmid asked him what he was doing there, Shaw responded, "I don't know, dear boy, I think it's something to do with science-fiction." His presence during the filming was kept secret from all but the minimum cast and crew, and Shaw was contractually obliged not to discuss any film secrets with anyone, even his family. The unmasking scene, directed by Richard Marquand, was filmed in one day and required only a few takes, with no alteration from the original dialogue. Lucas personally directed Shaw for his appearance in the final scene of the film, in which he plays Anakin's Force spirit. Shaw's likeness in this scene was replaced with that of Christensen in the 2004 DVD release. This attempt to tie the prequel and original trilogies together was one of the most controversial changes in a Star Wars re-release. Shaw received more fan mail and autograph requests from Return of the Jedi than he had for any role in the rest of his career. He later reflected that he enjoyed his experience on the film and expressed particular surprise that an action figure was made of his portrayal.

When The Phantom Menace was being produced, hundreds of actors were tested for the role of young Anakin before the producers settled on Jake Lloyd, who Lucas considered met his requirements of "a good actor, enthusiastic and very energetic". Producer Rick McCallum said that Lloyd was "smart, mischievous and loves anything mechanicaljust like Anakin." During production of Attack of the Clones, casting director Robin Gurland reviewed about 1,500 other candidates for the role of the young Anakin before Lucas eventually selected Hayden Christensen for the role, reportedly because he and Natalie Portman (the actress who plays Padmé Amidala) "looked good together". When Revenge of the Sith was being produced, Christensen and Ewan McGregor began rehearsing their climactic lightsaber duel long before Lucas would shoot it. They trained extensively with stunt coordinator Nick Gillard to memorize and perform their duel together. As in the previous prequel film, McGregor and Christensen performed their own lightsaber fighting scenes without the use of stunt doubles.

Anakin has also been voiced by Mat Lucas for the 2003 micro-series Clone Wars, and by Matt Lanter in the CGI animated film The Clone Wars, the television series of the same name and for Anakin's small roles in the animated series Rebels and Forces of Destiny. James Earl Jones reprised the voice role for Vader's appearances in Rebels. Both Lanter and Jones contributed their voices for the second-season finale of Rebels, at times with identical dialogue spoken by both actors blended together in different ways.

 Characteristics 
In Attack of the Clones, Anakin Skywalker feels "smothered" by Obi-Wan Kenobi and is incapable of controlling his own life. By Revenge of the Sith, however, his "father–son" friction with his master has matured into a more equal, brotherly relationship. Once he becomes Darth Vader, each evil act he commits shatters any hope or connection towards his previous life, which makes it harder for him to return to the light, but he ultimately escapes the dark side and redeems himself by sacrificing his life to save his son, Luke Skywalker, and kill the Emperor in Return of the Jedi.

Eric Bui, a psychiatrist at University of Toulouse Hospital, argued at the 2007 American Psychiatric Association convention that Anakin Skywalker meets six of the nine diagnostic criteria for borderline personality disorder (BPD), one more than necessary for a diagnosis. He and a colleague, Rachel Rodgers, published their findings in a 2010 letter to the editor of the journal Psychiatry Research. Bui says he found Anakin Skywalker a useful example to explain BPD to medical students. In particular, Bui points to Anakin's abandonment issues and uncertainty over his identity. Anakin's mass murders of the Tusken Raiders in Attack of the Clones and the young Jedi in Revenge of the Sith count as two dissociative episodes, fulfilling another criterion. Bui hoped his paper would help raise awareness of the disorder, especially among teens.

 Appearances 
Darth Vader/Anakin Skywalker appears in seven of the live-action Star Wars films, the animated series The Clone Wars (including the film), Rebels, and the micro-series Clone Wars and Forces of Destiny. He also has a main and recurring role in games, comics, books and the non-canon Star Wars Legends material.

 Skywalker saga 

 Original trilogy 

Darth Vader first appears in Star Wars as a ruthless cyborg Sith Lord serving the Galactic Empire. He is tasked, along with Grand Moff Tarkin (Peter Cushing), with recovering the secret plans for the Death Star battle station, which were stolen by the Rebel Alliance. Vader captures and tortures Princess Leia (Carrie Fisher), who has hidden the plans inside the droid R2-D2 (Kenny Baker) and sent it to find Vader's former Jedi Master Obi-Wan Kenobi (Alec Guinness) on the planet Tatooine. During Leia's rescue by Obi-Wan's allies Luke Skywalker (Mark Hamill) and Han Solo (Harrison Ford), Vader strikes down Obi-Wan in a lightsaber duel. Having placed a tracking device aboard their ship, the Millennium Falcon, Vader is able to track down the Rebel base on the planet Yavin 4. During the Rebel attack on the Death Star, Vader boards his TIE Advanced and shoots down Rebel X-wings, but Solo intervenes and sends Vader's ship spiraling off course, allowing Luke to destroy the Death Star.

After the Battle of Yavin, Vader is granted special powers usually reserved for the emperor alone, for particular military operations against the Rebel Alliance, and was made senior to all other generals and officials in their sphere of operations, no matter what their seniority otherwise, which allowed Vader to lead troops across provincial boundaries. In The Empire Strikes Back, Vader becomes obsessed with finding the Force-sensitive Luke and leads his stormtroopers to attack on the Rebel base on Hoth, but the Rebels escape. While conversing with the Emperor (Ian McDiarmid) via hologram, Vader convinces him that Luke would be a valuable ally if he could be turned to the dark side. Vader hires a group of bounty hunters to follow Luke's friends, and negotiates with Bespin administrator Lando Calrissian (Billy Dee Williams) to set a trap for them to bait Luke. After Han, Leia, Chewbacca (Peter Mayhew), and C-3PO (Anthony Daniels) arrive, Vader tortures and freezes Han in carbonite and gives him to the bounty hunter Boba Fett (Jeremy Bulloch). When Luke arrives, Vader overpowers him in a lightsaber duel, severing his hand. Vader tells Luke that he is his father, and tries to persuade him to join the dark side and help him overthrow the Emperor. Horrified, Luke escapes through an air shaft. Vader telepathically tells Luke that it is his destiny to join the dark side.

In Return of the Jedi, Vader and the Emperor supervise the final stages of the second Death Star's construction. Thinking that there is still good in his father, Luke surrenders to Vader and tries to convince him to turn from the dark side. Vader takes Luke to the second Death Star to meet the Emperor. While there, the Emperor tempts Luke to give in to his anger, which leads to Vader dueling with Luke once again. Realizing that Leia is Luke's twin sister, Vader threatens to turn her to the dark side if Luke will not submit. Furious, Luke overpowers Vader and severs his father's cybernetic hand. The Emperor entreats Luke to kill Vader and take his place. Luke refuses and the Emperor tortures him with Force lightning. Unwilling to let his son die for the same reasons he once stood for, Vader grabs the Emperor, picks him up and throws the Emperor down a reactor shaft to his death, but is mortally electrocuted in the process. The redeemed Anakin Skywalker asks Luke to remove his mask, and admits that there was still good in him after all as he dies peacefully in his son's arms. Luke escapes the second Death Star with his father's body and cremates it in a pyre on Endor. As the Rebels celebrate the second Death Star's destruction and the Empire's defeat, Luke sees the spirits of Anakin, Yoda (Frank Oz), and Obi-Wan watching over him.

In the original trilogy David Prowse physically portrayed Vader while James Earl Jones voiced him. Sebastian Shaw portrayed the unmasked Anakin in Return of the Jedi, as well as the character's spirit prior to the 2004 re-release when he was replaced by Hayden Christensen as Anakin's Force spirit.

 Prequel trilogy 

In Star Wars: Episode I – The Phantom Menace, which takes place 32 years before A New Hope, Anakin appears as a nine-year-old slave living on Tatooine with his mother Shmi (Pernilla August). In addition to being a gifted pilot and mechanic, Anakin has built his own protocol droid, C-3PO. Jedi Master Qui-Gon Jinn (Liam Neeson) meets Anakin after making an emergency landing on Tatooine with Queen of Naboo Padmé Amidala (Natalie Portman). Qui-Gon learns from Shmi that Anakin was conceived without a father and can foresee the future. Qui-Gon senses Anakin's strong connection to the Force and becomes convinced that he is the "Chosen One" of Jedi prophecy who will bring balance to the Force. He is even more convinced of this after learning Skywalker's midi-chlorian count was off the charts, revealing his potential to wield the Force was unparalleled. After winning his freedom in a podrace wager, Anakin leaves with Qui-Gon to be trained as a Jedi on Coruscant, but is forced to leave his mother behind. During the journey, Anakin forms a bond with Padmé. Qui-Gon asks the Jedi Council for permission to train Anakin, but they refuse, concerned about his vulnerability to the dark side. Eventually, Anakin helps end the corrupt Trade Federation's invasion of Naboo by destroying their control ship. After Qui-Gon is killed in a lightsaber duel with Sith Lord Darth Maul (portrayed by Ray Park, voiced by Peter Serafinowicz), he asks his apprentice Obi-Wan Kenobi (Ewan McGregor) to train Anakin, with the council's reluctant acceptance. Palpatine, newly elected as the Galactic Republic's Chancellor, befriends Anakin and tells him he will "watch [his] career with great interest".

In Episode II: Attack of the Clones, which takes place 10 years after The Phantom Menace, 19-year-old Anakin is still Obi-Wan's Padawan apprentice. Over the years, he has grown powerful but arrogant, and believes that Obi-Wan is holding him back. After rescuing Padmé from an assassination attempt, Anakin travels with her to Naboo as her bodyguard, and they fall in love, which is against the Jedi Code. Sensing that Shmi is in pain, Anakin travels with Padmé to Tatooine to rescue his mother. While there, Anakin learns that Shmi had been freed by and married farmer Cliegg Lars (Jack Thompson) a few years after he left. He then visits Cliegg and learns from him that she was kidnapped by Tusken Raiders. Anakin locates Shmi at a Tusken campsite, where she dies in his arms. Overcome with grief and rage, Anakin massacres the Tusken tribe and returns to the Lars homestead to bury Shmi. Anakin then travels with Padmé to Geonosis to rescue Obi-Wan from Sith Lord Count Dooku (Christopher Lee). Dooku captures the trio and sentences them to death. However, a battalion of Jedi arrives with an army of clone troopers to halt the executions. Obi-Wan and Anakin confront Dooku, but the Sith Lord beats them both in a lightsaber duel and severs Anakin's arm. After being rescued by Yoda, Anakin is fitted with a robotic arm and marries Padmé in a secret ceremony.

In Episode III: Revenge of the Sith, set three years after Attack of the Clones, Anakin is now a Jedi Knight and a hero of the Clone Wars. He and Obi-Wan lead a mission to rescue Palpatine from Separatist commander General Grievous (voiced by Matthew Wood). The two Jedi battle Count Dooku, whom Anakin overpowers and decapitates in cold blood at Palpatine's urging. They rescue Palpatine and return to Coruscant. Anakin reunites with Padmé, who tells him that she is pregnant. Although initially excited, Anakin soon begins to have nightmares about Padmé dying in childbirth. Palpatine also appoints Anakin to the Jedi Council as his personal representative. Suspicious of Palpatine, the Council allows Anakin as a member, but declines to grant him the rank of Jedi Master and instead instructs him to spy on Palpatine, diminishing Anakin's trust in the Jedi. Later, Palpatine reveals to Anakin that he is Sith Lord Darth Sidious, the mastermind of the war, and says that only he has the power to save Padmé from dying. Anakin reports Palpatine's treachery to Jedi Master Mace Windu (Samuel L. Jackson), who confronts and subdues the Sith Lord. Desperate to save Padmé, Anakin intervenes on Palpatine's behalf and disarms Windu, allowing Palpatine to kill him.  Anakin then pledges himself to the Sith, and Palpatine dubs him Darth Vader.

On Palpatine's orders, Vader leads the 501st Legion to kill everyone in the Jedi Temple, including the children, and then goes to the volcanic planet Mustafar to assassinate the Separatist Council. A distraught Padmé goes to Mustafar and pleads with Vader to abandon the dark side, but he refuses. Sensing Obi-Wan's presence, and thinking that they are conspiring to kill him, Vader angrily uses the Force to strangle Padmé to unconsciousness. Obi-Wan engages Vader in a lightsaber duel that ends with Obi-Wan severing Vader's limbs and leaving him for dead on the banks of a lava flow, where Vader sustains severe burns. Palpatine finds a barely alive Vader and takes him to Coruscant, where his mutilated body is treated and covered in the black suit first depicted in the original trilogy. When Vader asks if Padmé is safe, Palpatine says that he killed her out of anger, devastating him. At the end of the film, Vader supervises the construction of the first Death Star alongside Palpatine and Tarkin (Wayne Pygram).

Jake Lloyd played Anakin Skywalker as a child in The Phantom Menace, while Hayden Christensen played him as a young adult in the following two films. James Earl Jones reprised his role as the voice of Vader under his mask.

 Sequel trilogy 
Thirty years after the Galactic Civil War, Darth Vader's melted helmet appears in The Force Awakens (2015), in which Vader's grandson Kylo Ren (Adam Driver) – who has followed in his grandfather's footsteps by falling to the dark side and betraying the Jedi – is seen addressing him, though Vader does not appear in the film. At one point, his helmet was considered as the film's MacGuffin. The helmet appears again in The Rise of Skywalker (2019), when Kylo briefly meditates with it, and during the film's first duel between Kylo and Rey (Daisy Ridley). The helmet is last seen on the planet Kijimi, which is later destroyed by a Sith Star Destroyer. The film also reveals that the voice which Ren perceived coming from Vader's helmet in The Force Awakens was generated by a resurrected Palpatine.

In The Rise of Skywalker, Anakin makes a vocal cameo appearance, along with other "voices of Jedi Past", where he encourages Rey to "bring back the balance... as [he] did" before she faces Palpatine and his Sith forces. Palpatine uses the voice of Darth Vader to telepathically speak to Ren.

He is voiced by James Earl Jones as Vader and Hayden Christensen as Anakin.

 Other Star Wars films 
 The Clone Wars (film) 
In the 2008 3D animated film The Clone Wars, Yoda (voiced by Tom Kane) assigns Ahsoka Tano (voiced by Ashley Eckstein) as Anakin's Padawan apprentice, a responsibility Anakin is at first reluctant to accept. Anakin calls her "Snips" for her "snippy" attitude, while Ahsoka calls him "Skyguy" as a pun on his surname. After earning Anakin's respect during a dangerous mission, Ahsoka joins him on a quest to rescue Jabba the Hutt's infant son, Rotta. Her impetuousness both annoys and endears her to her master, and Anakin develops a friendly affection for his apprentice.

He is voiced by Matt Lanter.

 Rogue One 
In the anthology film Rogue One (2016), Darth Vader makes a cameo appearance in which he summons Orson Krennic (Ben Mendelsohn), the Imperial Director of Advanced Weapons Research, to his castle on Mustafar. He confronts him about his handling of the Death Star project and the destruction of Jedha City, while Krennic asks Vader for an audience with the Emperor regarding the Death Star, which he lost command of to Tarkin. Vader refuses, ordering him to ensure that the Death Star project has not been compromised. When Krennic asks him if he would still regain command of the Death Star, Vader uses the Force to choke him, telling him, "Be careful not to choke on your aspirations, Director." At the end of the film, Vader boards the disabled Rebel flagship, the MC75 Star Cruiser Profundity, with a cadre of 501st Legion troopers and kills several Rebel soldiers as he attempts to recover the plans. However, the docked blockade runner Tantive IV escapes with the plans, setting up the events of A New Hope.

Darth Vader had a much different role in early versions of the film's story. Screenwriter Gary Whitta stated that in his initial pitch, Vader would appear on Scarif and slaughter the Rebel blockade there. In an earlier storyline, Vader would also have killed Krennic for his failure to prevent the Rebels from stealing the Death Star plans. An image of a deleted scene featuring Vader was revealed in February 2021 by Industrial Light & Magic visual effects animator Hal Hickel, who added that Vader was supposed to have a conversation with Tarkin in that scene.

James Earl Jones also reprises his role from previous films as the voice of Darth Vader, who is physically portrayed by Spencer Wilding during the meeting with Krennic and aboard the Star Destroyer, and by Daniel Naprous for the end scene.

 Television series 
 Clone Wars (2003–2005) 
Anakin is a lead character in all three seasons of the Clone Wars micro-series, which takes place shortly after the conclusion of Attack of the Clones. Anakin becomes a Jedi Knight and is quickly promoted to a General of the Republic's Clone Army, due in part to Palpatine's (voiced by Nick Jameson) influence. Among other missions, he fights a duel with Dooku's apprentice Asajj Ventress (voiced by Grey DeLisle), helps Obi-Wan (voiced by James Arnold Taylor) capture a Separatist-controlled fortress and rescues Jedi Master Saesee Tiin (voiced by Dee Bradley Baker) during a space battle. During the third season, Anakin frees a planet's indigenous species from Separatist control and sees a cryptic vision of his future as Darth Vader. In the series finale, Anakin and Obi-Wan go on a mission to rescue Palpatine from General Grievous, leading to the opening of Revenge of the Sith.

He is voiced by Mat Lucas as an adult and Frankie Ryan Mariquez as a child.

 The Clone Wars (2008–2014, 2020) 
Anakin is a lead character in all seasons of The Clone Wars. As a Jedi Knight, he leads the 501st Legion on missions with both his master Obi-Wan and apprentice Ahsoka Tano throughout the war. Some of Anakin's actions taken out of concern for Ahsoka violate the Jedi code, such as torturing prisoners who may know her location when she goes missing. Throughout the series there are several references to Anakin's eventual fall to the dark side, including visions of his future as Darth Vader in the third season, and disillusion with the Jedi Council after they wrongly accuse Ahsoka of bombing the Jedi Temple in the fifth season. While she is later forgiven after the true culprit is found, she nonetheless chooses to leave the Jedi Order. Anakin appears as Vader in the final scene of the series finale, set some time after Revenge of the Sith. He investigates the crash site of the Venator-class Star Destroyer Tribunal, which was destroyed during Order 66. Finding one of Ahsoka's lightsabers among the wreckage, Vader assumes that his former Padawan has perished and leaves in silence.

Matt Lanter reprised his role as Anakin from the movie.

 Rebels (2014–2018) 
Darth Vader appears in Star Wars Rebels, which takes place 14 years after The Clone Wars concluded. He makes minor appearances throughout the first season, and serves as the main antagonist for most of the second season. At the beginning of the series, Vader leads a squadron of Force-sensitive Imperial Inquisitors who actively search for and kill any remaining Jedi and Force-sensitive children. In the first season, he dispatches the Grand Inquisitor to hunt a Rebel cell causing trouble for the Empire on Lothal, and personally arrives on Lothal to deal with the Rebel threat after the Inquisitor is killed. In the second-season premiere, Vader orchestrates the murder of Imperial Minister Maketh Tua, who tried to defect to the Rebellion, and confronts the Jedi Kanan Jarrus and Ezra Bridger. When he later attacks the fleet of the Phoenix Squadron, Vader discovers that Ahsoka is still alive and has joined the Rebel Alliance, while Ahsoka is overwhelmed when she recognizes Anakin under "a layer of hate" in Darth Vader. The Emperor orders Vader to dispatch another Inquisitor to capture her. Later in the season, Ahsoka has a vision in which Anakin blames her for allowing him to fall to the dark side. In the season finale, Ahsoka duels with her former master inside a Sith Temple, allowing her friends to escape Vader and the temple's destruction. As the episode concludes, Vader escapes from the temple's ruins while Ahsoka's fate is left unknown. Vader makes a final voiceless cameo in the late fourth-season episode "A World Between Worlds", in which it is revealed that Ahsoka escaped from her previous duel with Vader by entering a Force-realm that exists outside of time and space. Shortly afterward, Vader's voice (archival audio from Return of the Jedi) is heard echoing in the void.

Matt Lanter reprised his role from The Clone Wars as Anakin and James Earl Jones as Vader. Both Lanter and Jones contributed their voices for the second-season finale, at times with identical dialogue spoken by both actors blended together in different ways.

 Forces of Destiny (2017–2018) 
Anakin Skywalker appears in multiple episodes of the 2D animated online micro-series Forces of Destiny with Matt Lanter reprising his role.

 Obi-Wan Kenobi (2022) 
Hayden Christensen returned as Darth Vader, both in and out of armor, in the Disney+ streaming series Obi-Wan Kenobi with Dimitrious Bistrevesky serving as performance artist for the character, while James Earl Jones returns to voice the character. The series reveals that for a decade after their duel on Mustafar, Obi-Wan believed his fallen apprentice to be dead, only for the Imperial Inquisitor Reva to reveal that Anakin Skywalker is alive. After Reva draws out Kenobi, Vader begins hunting his former master, seeking to exact revenge on Kenobi for the injuries he inflicted upon him back on Mustafar. Christensen also returns in flashback sequences, both as a newly minted Darth Vader carrying out the massacre at the Jedi Temple, and as Padawan Anakin Skywalker, training with Kenobi in the years preceding the Clone Wars.

 Ahsoka 
In October 2021, The Hollywood Reporter reported that, according to undisclosed sources, Christensen would reprise his role as Anakin in the Ahsoka series, which is set after the original trilogy and scheduled for 2023.

 Video games 
Darth Vader and Anakin Skywalker have appeared in a number of Star Wars since the earliest days of the franchise, though rarely as a playable character. Vader plays a central role in Star Wars: The Force Unleashed (2008), where he is the playable character for the first level of the game. He also appears in the sequel Star Wars: The Force Unleashed II as the final boss.

Vader makes a cameo appearance in the final mission of Star Wars Jedi: Fallen Order, after the main antagonist, the Second Sister, is defeated. After Vader kills her for her failure to retrieve a Jedi Holocron, the protagonist, Padawan Cal Kestis, must escape from Vader, who attempts to get the Holocron in his possession. Cal is ultimately able to escape from Vader's grasp with the help of his allies.

Darth Vader has appeared as a playable character in every Lego Star Wars video game to date, including The Skywalker Saga.

Darth Vader has appeared as a playable character and a boss in Angry Birds Star Wars and its sequel played by Red. When Vader is used, building blocks magnetically stick to his body and are then fired out at various angles.

Darth Vader is also a playable character in Disney Infinity 3.0, and a playable character to unlock for a limited time in Disney Magic Kingdoms.

In video games, Darth Vader is often voiced by Scott Lawrence or Matt Sloan, while Anakin is voiced by Mat Lucas and Matt Lanter.

 Canon literature Star Wars: Lords of the Sith was one of the first four canon novels to be released in 2014 and 2015. In it, Vader and Palpatine find themselves hunted by revolutionaries on the Twi'lek planet Ryloth.

 Comics 

In 2015, Marvel released a 25-issue series called Darth Vader (2015–16), written by Kieron Gillen. It focuses on the Sith lord in the aftermath of the Death Star's destruction, as well as his life after learning about his son's existence, and introduces franchise fan favorite character Doctor Aphra. This series takes place parallel to the comic book series Star Wars, in which Vader and Luke meet; the two series have a crossover titled Vader Down. A continuation set between The Empire Strikes Back and Return of the Jedi debuted in 2020, written by Greg Pak. The first few issues deal with Vader carrying out his revenge on those who concealed Luke; he also visits Padmé's tomb on Naboo and encounters her handmaidens. A subsequent story arc depicts Vader being tested by the Emperor and incorporates elements created for The Rise of Skywalker.

The five-issue limited series Obi-Wan & Anakin (2016), written by Charles Soule, depicts the lives of the titular Jedi between The Phantom Menace and Attack of the Clones. At New York Comic Con 2015, Soule described the story as "pretty unexplored territory".

Between 2017 and 2018, Soule wrote a prequel-era series, also called Darth Vader (sometimes subtitled Dark Lord of the Sith). It begins immediately after Vader wakes up in his armor at the end of Revenge of the Sith and explores his emotional transformation upon learning of Padmé's death, his adjustment to his mechanical suit, how he creates his red-bladed lightsaber, and his hunting of Jedi in the Inquisitor program (introduced in Rebels). Its final arc, which deals with the construction of Vader's fortress on Mustafar, implies that Palpatine used the Force to conceive Anakin in utero, as some had theorized that Revenge of the Sith indicates. A Lucasfilm story group member later clarified that "This is all in Anakin's head".

A five-issue limited series written by Dennis Hopeless, Vader: Dark Visions, was released in 2019. According to Marvel, the series "sheds new light on the many sides of the galaxy's greatest villain". Vader Down writer Jason Aaron wrote part of the upcoming anthology miniseries Darth Vader: Black, White & Red, an extension of a Marvel event highlighting fan-favorite characters.

 Legends 
In April 2014, most of the licensed Star Wars novels and comics produced since the originating 1977 film Star Wars were rebranded by Lucasfilm as Legends and declared non-canon to the franchise.

 Books 
Vader is featured prominently in novels set in the Star Wars universe. In the 1978 novel Splinter of the Mind's Eye by Alan Dean Foster, Vader meets Luke for the first time and engages him in a lightsaber duel that ends with Luke cutting off Vader's arm and Vader falling into a deep pit. Shadows of the Empire (1996) reveals that Vader is conflicted about trying to turn his son to the dark side, and knows deep down that he still has good in him.

Vader's supposedly indestructible glove is the MacGuffin of the young-reader's book The Glove of Darth Vader (1992). Anakin Skywalker's redeemed spirit appears in The Truce at Bakura (1993), set a few days after the end of Return of the Jedi. He appears to Leia, imploring her forgiveness. Leia condemns Anakin for his crimes and banishes him from her life. He promises that he will be there for her when she needs him, and disappears. In Tatooine Ghost (2003), Leia learns to forgive her father after learning about his childhood as a slave and his mother's traumatic death. In The Unifying Force (2003), Anakin tells his grandson Jacen Solo to "stand firm" in his battle with the Supreme Overlord of the Yuuzhan Vong.

Upon the release of the prequel films, the Expanded Universe grew to include novels about Vader's former life as Anakin. Greg Bear's 2000 novel Rogue Planet and Jude Watson's Jedi Quest series chronicle Anakin's early missions with Obi-Wan, while James Luceno's 2005 novel Labyrinth of Evil, set during the Clone Wars, depicts Anakin battling Separatist commander General Grievous. In Luceno's Dark Lord: The Rise of Darth Vader (2005), set a few months after the events of Revenge of the Sith, Vader disavows his identity as Anakin as he hunts down surviving Jedi and cements his position in the Empire.

In the Dark Nest trilogy (2005), Luke and Leia uncover old recordings of their parents in R2-D2's memory drive; for the first time, they see their own birth and their mother's death, as well as their father's corruption to the dark side. In Bloodlines (2006), Han and Leia's son Jacen—who has turned to the dark side—uses the Force to envision Vader slaughtering the children at the Jedi Temple.

Vader also appears in a series of tongue-in-cheek children's books by Jeffrey Brown. In Brown's series, a hapless Vader sets out to be a father to a young Luke and Leia, with some scenes portraying light-hearted versions of their darker film counterparts. For example, one scene shows Vader, Luke and Leia at the carbonite freezing chamber on Bespin, with Vader pronouncing the freezer adequate for making ice cream.

 Comics 
Vader appears in several comic books such as Marvel Comics' Star Wars (1977–1986). In Dark Empire II, he is revealed to have had a castle on the planet Vjun. Anakin Skywalker is a major character in Dark Horse Comics' Star Wars: Republic series (1998–2006). In Boba Fett: Enemy of the Empire (1999), Vader hires Fett a few years before the events of A New Hope. In Vader's Quest (1999), set soon after A New Hope, the dark lord encounters Luke for the first time. Star Wars: Empire (2002–2005) spans from about a year before A New Hope to several months afterwards. Anakin and Vader appear in the non-canonical Star Wars Tales (1999–2005); in the story Resurrection, Darth Maul is resurrected and faces Vader in battle.

Vader-centric comics released and set just after Revenge of the Sith include Dark Times (2006–2013), Darth Vader and the Lost Command (2011), Darth Vader and the Ghost Prison (2012), and Darth Vader and the Cry of Shadows (2013–14).

 Virtual reality game 

In the 2015 Star Wars Celebration, it was announced David S. Goyer was helping to develop a virtual reality game series based on Darth Vader. As an observer with limited influence, the player is able to walk, pick up, push and open things, and possibly affect the story. The game, titled Vader Immortal, had three episodes overall, set between Revenge of the Sith and Rogue One; the first became available with the launch of Oculus Quest, while the last episode was released on November 21, 2019. The game was later ported to the Oculus Rift. On August 25, 2020, all three episodes were also released on PlayStation VR.

In the games Vader was voiced by Scott Lawrence.

 Other 
The Star Wars Holiday Special, a television special broadcast by CBS in 1978, features a brief appearance of Darth Vader, who appears on-screen speaking with Imperial officer "Chief Bast" in footage cut from the original 1977 film. The sequence is dubbed with new dialogue, performed by James Earl Jones. In the story, Vader colludes with Boba Fett to entrap the Rebels.

He appears in the Lego Star Wars shorts voiced by Matt Sloan as Vader and Kirby Morrow as Anakin.

Darth Vader features in the 1981 radio drama adaptation of Star Wars, voiced by the actor Brock Peters. Vader makes his first appearance on the planet Ralltiir, where he treats Princess Leia with suspicion. In later extended scenes, he is heard interrogating and torturing Leia on board his Star Destroyer and aboard the Death Star.

Vader appears in Star Tours – The Adventures Continue, where he is once again voiced by Jones.

Darth Vader has also appeared in non-Star Wars video games as a guest character, for example Soulcalibur IV (2008). 
An action figure of Vader comes to life alongside RoboCop and Jurassic Park toys in The Indian in the Cupboard (1995). Vader also had a brief cameo in Night at the Museum: Battle of the Smithsonian (2009), in which he and Oscar the Grouch try unsuccessfully to join the army formed by Ivan the Terrible, Napoleon and Al Capone.

 Cultural impact 

In 2003, the American Film Institute listed Vader as the third greatest movie villain in cinema history on AFI's 100 Years...100 Heroes & Villains, behind Hannibal Lecter and Norman Bates. His role as a tragic hero in the saga has also met with positive reviews. 	
Contrarily, in 1977, a New Journal and Guide writer criticized the lack of racial diversity in the original Star Wars film, pointing out that "the force of evil ... is dressed in all black and has the voice of a black man." George Lucas felt hurt at such accusations.

Psychiatrists have considered Vader to be a useful example for explaining borderline personality disorder to medical students. Anakin's origin story in The Phantom Menace has been compared to signifiers of African American racial identity, particularly his being a slave, and his dissatisfaction with his life has been compared to Siddartha's before he became Gautama Buddha. A Mexican church advised Christians against seeing The Phantom Menace because it portrays Anakin as a Christ figure.

Many films and television series have paid homage to Darth Vader. The 1982 movie Cosmic Princess, compiled from parts of Space: 1999 episodes, contains several Star Wars references including a character named "Vader". Marty McFly in Back to the Future (1985), dressed in a radiation suit, calls himself "Darth Vader from the planet Vulcan" in one scene. Vader is parodied as "Dark Helmet" (Rick Moranis) in the Star Wars parody Spaceballs (1987). A primary antagonist in Final Fantasy IV (1991) was stated by game creator Takashi Tokita to be based on Vader. In Chasing Amy (1997), Hooper X (Dwight Ewell) speaks at a comic book convention about Darth Vader being a metaphor for how poorly the science fiction genre treats Black people; he is especially offended that Vader, the "Blackest brother in the galaxy", reveals himself to be a "feeble, crusty old white man" at the end of Return of the Jedi. Vader, especially his role as a father, is parodied as Emperor Zurg in Toy Story 2. The character of Dark Mayhem in The Thundermans is also a parody of Vader, especially in his original depiction. The Warner Bros. animated show Loonatics Unleashed has a Sylvester the Cat-type character named Sylth Vester, a play on Vader and his name.

The slime-mold beetle Agathidium vaderi is named after Vader, as is the louse Ricinus vaderi. Several buildings across the globe are regularly compared to him. A grotesque of Darth Vader looms over the east face of the Washington National Cathedral's northwest tower. During the 2007–08 NHL season, Ottawa Senators goaltender Martin Gerber performed so well in an all-black mask that fans endearingly termed him "Darth Gerber".

Many commentators and comedians have also evoked Vader's visage to satirize politicians and other public figures, and several American political figures have been unflatteringly compared to the character. In response to Ronald Reagan's proposed Strategic Defense Initiative (dubbed "Star Wars" by his political opponents), German news magazine Der Spiegel portrayed the president wearing Vader's helmet on its cover in 1984. In 2005, Al Gore referred to Tele-Communications Inc.'s John C. Malone as the "Darth Vader of cable", and political strategist Lee Atwater was known by his political enemies as "the Darth Vader of the Republican Party". Native American artist Bunky Echohawk portrayed General George Armstrong Custer as Vader in his painting Darth Custer. In 2015, a statue of Vladimir Lenin in Odessa, Ukraine, was converted into one of Vader due to a law on decommunization.

In 2006, while discussing the war on terror, US Vice President Dick Cheney stated, "I suppose, sometimes, people look at my demeanor and say, 'Well, he's the Darth Vader of the administration.'"
In January 2007, Jon Stewart put on a Vader helmet to address Cheney as a "kindred spirit" on The Daily Show. Cheney's wife, Lynne, presented Stewart with a Darth Vader action figure on her October 2007 appearance on the show. Both Stewart and Stephen Colbert have occasionally referred to Cheney as "Darth Cheney". In the satirical cartoon show Lil' Bush, Cheney's father is portrayed as Vader. At a presidential campaign event in September 2007, Hillary Clinton also referred to Cheney as Vader. At the 2008 Washington Radio and Television Correspondents' Association Dinner, Cheney joked that his wife told him that the Vader comparison "humanizes" him. In 2009, George Lucas stated that Cheney is more akin to Palpatine, and that a better stand-in for Vader would be George W. Bush. An issue of Newsweek referenced this quote, and compared Bush and Cheney to Vader and Palpatine, respectively, in a satirical article comparing politicians to various Star Wars and Star Trek characters.

The Fedayeen Saddam, an Iraqi paramilitary organisation, was issued with fiber glass Darth Vader-style helmets from 1995, apparently at the instigation of their commander, Uday Hussein, who was said to have been an avid Star Wars fan. A number of them were brought to the United States and the United Kingdom as souvenirs following the 2003 invasion of Iraq.

In 2010, IGN ranked Darth Vader 25th in the "Top 100 Videogame Villains".

In Ukraine, the Internet Party of Ukraine regularly lets people named Darth Vader take part in elections.

In 2019, an original Vader helmet from The Empire Strikes Back was sold for $900,000 in an online auction.

On December 2, 2020, a figurine of Vader appeared on the plinth where the statue of Edward Colston once stood in Bristol, United Kingdom, in what was seen as a tribute to David Prowse, who died on November 29, 2020.

Relationships
Family tree

Mentorship tree

 References 
Notes

Citations

Sources

 Further reading Star Wars Episode I: The Phantom Menace Novelization, 1st edition paperback, 1999. , Star Wars Episode II: Attack of the Clones Novelization, 2003. , Star Wars Episode III: Revenge of the Sith Novelization, 1st edition hardcover, 2005. , Star Wars: The Phantom Menace: The Visual Dictionary, hardcover, 1999. , Star Wars: Attack of the Clones: The Visual Dictionary, hardcover, 2002. , Star Wars: Revenge of the Sith: The Visual Dictionary'', hardcover, 2005. ,

External links 

 Darth Vader on IMDb

 
Burn survivors in fiction
Characters created by George Lucas
Child characters in film
Christ figures in fiction
Cyborg supervillains
Extraterrestrial supervillains
Fantasy television characters
Fictional amputees
Fictional assassins
Fictional characters who committed sedition or treason
Fictional characters with borderline personality disorder
Fictional characters with disfigurements
Fictional characters with precognition
Fictional murderers of children
Fictional commanders
Fictional cyborgs
Fictional defectors
Fictional fighter pilots
Fictional kidnappers
Fictional genocide perpetrators
Fictional mass murderers
Fictional military personnel in films
Fictional rampage and spree killers
Fictional child slaves
Fictional space pilots
Fictional energy swordfighters
Fictional telepaths
Fictional torturers and interrogators
Fictional war criminals
Fictional war veterans
Fictional warlords
Film characters introduced in 1977
Film supervillains
Male characters in film
Male characters in television
Male film villains
Star Wars Anthology characters
Star Wars Rebels characters
Star Wars: The Clone Wars characters
Star Wars comics characters
Star Wars literary characters
Star Wars Sith characters
Star Wars Skywalker Saga characters
Star Wars video game characters
Tales of the Jedi (TV series) characters
Teenage characters in film
Video game bosses
Fictional regicides